The Pumi language (also known as Prinmi) is a Qiangic language used by the Pumi people, an ethnic group from Yunnan, China, as well as by the Tibetan people of Muli in Sichuan, China. Most native speakers live in Lanping, Ninglang, Lijiang, Weixi and Muli.

In Muli Bonist priests read religious texts in Tibetan, which needs to be interpreted into Prinmi. An attempt to teach Pumi children to write their language using the Tibetan script has been seen in Ninglang. A pinyin-based Roman script has been proposed, but is not commonly used.

Dialects
Earlier works suggest there are two branches of Pumi (southern and northern), and they are not mutually intelligible. Ding (2014) proposes three major groups: Western Prinmi (spoken in Lanping), Central Prinmi (spoken in southwestern Ninglang, Lijiang, Yulong and Yongsheng) and Northern Prinmi (spoken in northern Ninglang and Sichuan).

Lu (2001)
Dialects of Pumi include the following (Lu 2001).

Southern (22,000 speakers)
Qinghua 箐花村, Lanping County, Yunnan
Ludian 鲁甸县, Yunnan
Xinyingpan 新营盘乡, Ninglang County, Yunnan

Northern (55,000 speakers)
Taoba 桃巴村, Muli County, Sichuan
Tuoqi 拖七村, Ninglang County, Yunnan
Zuosuo 左所区, Yanyuan County, Sichuan
Sanyanlong 三岩龙乡, Jiulong County, Sichuan

Sim (2017)
Sims (2017) lists the following dialects of Pumi.
Northern
Sanyanlong 三岩龙 [Jiulong County] (B. Huang & Dai 1992)
Taoba 桃巴 [Muli County] (Sun 1991)
Shuiluo 水洛 [Muli County] (Jacques 2011)
Central
Wadu 瓦都 [Ninglang County] (Daudey 2014)
Niuwozi 牛窝子 [Ninglang County] (Ding 2001, etc.)
Southern
Dayang [Lanping County] (Matisoff 1997)
Qinghua 箐花 [Lanping County] (Sun 1991; B. Huang & Dai 1992)

Sims (2017) reconstructs high tones and low tones for Proto-Prinmi.

Documentation 
Transcribed, translated and annotated audio documents in the Pumi language are available from the Pangloss Collection. They concern Northern dialects of Pumi.

Phonology

Orthography 
The pinyin-based Roman script for Pumi has been proposed, but yet to be promoted.

Tones:
 Monosyllabic words
 f – falling tone
 v – high tone
 none – rising tone
 Polysyllable words
 f – nonspreading of the high tone
 v – spreading of the high tone to the next syllable
 r – rising tone
 none – default low tone

Grammar 

A reference grammar of the Wadu dialect of Pumi is available online. A grammar of Central Pumi is also available.

Example

References

Bibliography 

 
 
 
 
 
 

Qiangic languages
Languages of China
Pumi people